Ashok Ghosh was an Indian politician belonging to All India Trinamool Congress. He was elected as a member of West Bengal Legislative Assembly from Howrah Uttar in 1982, 1987 and 2011. He died on 13 January 2017.

References

2017 deaths
Trinamool Congress politicians from West Bengal
West Bengal MLAs 1982–1987
West Bengal MLAs 1987–1991
West Bengal MLAs 2011–2016
1942 births